Wygon  is a village in the administrative district of Gmina Bierzwnik, within Choszczno County, West Pomeranian Voivodeship, in north-western Poland.

The village has an approximate population of 300.

References

Wygon